Klimis Alexandrou (born 1 September 1974) is a retired Cypriot football defender.

References

1974 births
Living people
Cypriot footballers
Pezoporikos Larnaca players
AEK Larnaca FC players
APOEL FC players
Association football forwards
Cypriot First Division players
Cyprus international footballers